Yu Yonghong (born May 1963) is a lieutenant general (zhongjiang) of the People's Liberation Army (PLA). He has been Secretary of People's Liberation Army Ground Force Commission for Discipline Inspection since April 2019, and formerly served as Political Commissar of the 79th Group Army.

Biography
Yu was born in Nanchong, Sichuan in May 1963. He served in Chengdu Military Region and Tibet Military District for a long time. In April 2011, he was appointed Director of Political Department of the 14th Group Army, a position he held until March 2015, when he was appointed Deputy Director of Political Department of the Chengdu Military Region. He was Political Commissar of the Yunnan Military District in July 2015, and held that office until September 2015. He became Political Commissar of the 14th Group Army in September 2015, and served until March 2017, when he was appointed Political Commissar of the 79th Group Army. In April 2019, he rose to become Secretary of People's Liberation Army Ground Force Commission for Discipline Inspection, replacing Wu Gang. On December 11, 2019, he was awarded the military rank of lieutenant general (zhongjiang) by Central Military Commission chairman Xi Jinping.

References

1963 births
People from Nanchong
Living people
People's Liberation Army generals from Sichuan